On 2 November 1991, a bomb planted by the Provisional IRA exploded in the Military Wing at Musgrave Park Hospital, Belfast. Two British soldiers were killed and 11 other people were injured, among them a five-year-old girl and a baby of four months.

Background 
Paramilitary attacks in hospital grounds were not unknown during The Troubles in Northern Ireland; for example, in May 1976 a British soldier, member of a liaison team from the Royal Anglian Regiment, was seriously injured when an Irish National Liberation Army (INLA) gunman opened fire in a corridor in the Royal Victoria Hospital, Belfast. One of the five shots fired also hit a male nurse. On 28 October 1976, Ulster Freedom Fighters (UUF) militants shot and killed former Sinn Féin vice-president Máire Drumm at Mater Hospital in Belfast, while she was recovering from an eye operation. A former British soldier working as security guard colluded with the killers. In March 1977 a booby-trap bomb exploded in the vicinity of Royal Victoria Hospital's sports complex as three Royal Ulster Constabulary (RUC) officers passed although none were injured; a week earlier the IRA had claimed that the British Army was using part of the hospital grounds for surveillance work. The 2 November 1991 attack was believed to be the first time a hospital had been  the intended target of an attack, rather than an incident involving specific individuals.

Bombing
On 2 November 1991, a Provisional IRA active service unit infiltrated a service tunnel connecting the Withers block, containing orthopaedic and children's wards and the Military Wing, and planted a device containing  of Semtex against steel security doors. The bomb exploded in the afternoon as several patients were watching a rugby game in a recreation area in the Military Wing, located directly beneath an operating theatre. The blast caused extensive damage to the building with walls buckled outwards and part of a staircase collapsing. Several small fires were also ignited. At first it was thought there had been a gas leak.
Two soldiers were killed (Phil Cross, Royal Army Medical Corps, Craig Pantry, Royal Corps of Transport) and 11 other people were injured, among them a five-year-old girl and a baby of four months. The dead and injured were watching a rugby match on television in the Military Wing's social club. The children's ward and a creche were within a hundred yards of the military complex and children had to be evacuated after broken glass made their ward uninhabitable.

Aftermath 
As well as the deaths and injuries, the blast from the explosion caused severe damage to both the Military Wing and the newly refurbished children's ward in the Withers block. At least 97 operations due to have been performed that week were cancelled, 80 out of the 200 patient beds in the hospital were rendered unusable and damage totalling at least £250,000 was caused. 

The bombing was widely condemned and intensified growing calls for the re-introduction of internment without trial from Unionist politicians and some senior figures of the British Army and Royal Ulster Constabulary in Northern Ireland. Northern Ireland's Deputy Chief Ambulance officer Tom McKee called the attack "deplorable". The Irish Minister for Foreign Affairs Gerry Collins said of the bombing: "An attack against a hospital must be regarded as a particularly heinous violation of the most basic standards of human decency."

See also 

 Chronology of Provisional Irish Republican Army actions (1990–99)
 Crumlin Road Prison bombing
 Teebane bombing
 Glenanne barracks bombing

References

1991 in Northern Ireland
Attacks on hospitals
Improvised explosive device bombings in Northern Ireland
Provisional Irish Republican Army actions
Terrorist incidents in the United Kingdom in 1991
1990s murders in Northern Ireland
1991 crimes in Ireland
Royal Army Medical Corps
Conflicts in 1991
Building bombings in Northern Ireland